Financial Times Business Book of the Year Award is an annual award given to the best business book of the year as determined by the Financial Times. It aims to find the book that has "the most compelling and enjoyable insight into modern business issues". The award was established in 2005 and is worth .

The award's principal partner was Goldman Sachs from 2005–2013, when it was known as the "Financial Times and Goldman Sachs Business Book of the Year Award". McKinsey & Company supported the Business Book Award from 2014 until 2021, when it was known as the "Financial Times and McKinsey Business Book of the Year Award".

Since 2014, the Financial Times Business Book of the Year Award is presented at the same time as the Bracken Bower Prize for young business writers.

Winners and shortlist
Blue Ribbon = winner

2005
The shortlist was announced 20 September 2005, and the winner announced 24 November 2005.

John Battelle, The Search: How Google and Its Rivals Rewrote the Rules of Business and Transformed Our Culture
Steven Levitt and Stephen Dubner, Freakonomics: A Rogue Economist Explores the Hidden Side of Everything
 Thomas Friedman, The World Is Flat: A Brief History of the Twenty-First Century
Constantinos C. Markides, Paul Geroski, Fast Second: How Smart Companies Bypass Radical Innovation to Enter and Dominate New Markets
Pietra Rivoli, The Travels of a T-Shirt in the Global Economy: An Economist Examines the Markets, Power and Politics of World Trade
James B. Stewart, DisneyWar

2006
The shortlist was announced 18 September 2006, and the winner announced 27 October 2006.

Chris Anderson, The Long Tail: Why the Future of Business is Selling Less of More
Bo Burlingham, Small Giants: Companies that Choose to Be Great Instead of Big
Charles Fishman, The Wal-Mart Effect: How the World's Most Powerful Company Really Works—and How It's Transforming the American Economy
 James Kynge, China Shakes The World: A Titan's Rise and Troubled Future – and the Challenge for America
Marc Levinson, The Box: How the Shipping Container Made the World Smaller and the World Economy Bigger

2007

The shortlist was announced 25 September 2007, and the winner announced 25 October 2007.

 William D. Cohan, The Last Tycoons: The Secret History of Lazard Frères & Co.
Alan Greenspan, The Age of Turbulence: Adventures in a New World
Philippe Legrain, Immigrants: Your Country Needs Them
Nassim Nicholas Taleb, The Black Swan: The Impact of the Highly Improbable
Don Tapscott and Anthony D Williams, Wikinomics: How Mass Collaboration Changes Everything
Iain Carson and Vijay Vaitheeswaran, ZOOM: The Global Race to Fuel the Car of the Future

2008

The shortlist was announced 18 September 2008 and the winner announced 14 October 2008.

William J. Bernstein, A Splendid Exchange: How Trade Shaped the World
Tim Bouquet & Byron Ousey, Cold Steel: The Multi-billion-dollar Battle for a Global Industry
 Mohamed El-Erian, When Markets Collide: Investment Strategies for the Age of Global Economic Change
Misha Glenny, McMafia: A Journey Through the Global Criminal Underworld
Lawrence Lessig, Remix: Making Art and Commerce Thrive in the Hybrid Economy
Alice Schroeder, The Snowball: Warren Buffett and the Business of Life

2009
The longlist was announced 12 August 2009, the shortlist announced around 18 September 2009, and the winner announced 29 October 2009.

 Liaquat Ahamed, Lords of Finance: The Bankers Who Broke the World
Stephen Green, Good Value: Reflections on Money, Morality and an Uncertain World
Nandan Nilekani, Imagining India: The Idea of a Renewed Nation
Frank Partnoy, The Match King
George Akerlof and Robert Shiller, Animal Spirits: How Human Psychology Drives the Economy, and Why It Matters for Global Capitalism
David Wessel, In Fed We Trust

2010
The longlist was announced 9 August 2010, the shortlist was announced 16 September 2010, and the winner announced 19 October 2010.

Sheena Iyengar, The Art of Choosing
David Kirkpatrick, The Facebook Effect: The Inside Story of the Company That Is Connecting the World 
Michael Lewis, The Big Short: Inside the Doomsday Machine
Sebastian Mallaby, More Money Than God: Hedge Funds and the Making of a New Elite
 Raghuram G. Rajan, Fault Lines: How Hidden Fractures Still Threaten the World Economy
Andrew Ross Sorkin, Too Big to Fail: The Inside Story of How Wall Street and Washington Fought to Save the Financial System – and Themselves

2011

The longlist was announced on 9 August 2011, the shortlist was announced on 14 September and the winner was announced on 3 November 2011.

 Abhijit V. Banerjee and Esther Duflo, Poor Economics: A Radical Rethinking of the Way to Fight Global Poverty
Barry Eichengreen, Exorbitant Privilege: The Rise and Fall of the Dollar and the Future of the International Monetary System
Edward Glaeser, Triumph of the City: How Our Greatest Invention Makes Us Richer, Smarter, Greener, Healthier, and Happier
Margaret Heffernan, Willful Blindness: Why We Ignore the Obvious at Our Peril
Richard Rumelt, Good Strategy Bad Strategy: The Difference and Why It Matters 
Daniel Yergin, The Quest: Energy, Security, and the Remaking of the Modern World

2012

The shortlist was announced on 13 September 2012. The winner was announced on 2 November 2012.

Daron Acemoglu and James A. Robinson, Why Nations Fail: The Origins of Power, Prosperity and Poverty
John M. Coates, The Hour Between Dog and Wolf: Risk-taking, Gut Feelings and the Biology of Boom and Bust
 Steve Coll, Private Empire: ExxonMobil and American Power
Walter Isaacson, Steve Jobs: The Exclusive Biography
Michael J. Sandel, What Money Can’t Buy: The Moral Limits Of Markets
William L. Silber, Volcker: The Triumph of Persistence

2013

The longlist was announced in August 2013. The shortlist was announced on 18 September 2013. The winner was announced on 18 November 2013.

Neil Irwin, The Alchemists: Inside the Secret World of Central Bankers
Iain Martin, Making it Happen: Fred Goodwin, RBS and the Men Who Blew Up the British Economy
Viktor Mayer-Schönberger and Kenneth Cukier, Big Data: A Revolution That Will Transform How We Live, Work, and Think
Anita Raghavan, The Billionaire's Apprentice: The Rise of The Indian-American Elite and The Fall of The Galleon Hedge Fund
Sheryl Sandberg, Lean In: Women, Work, and the Will to Lead
 Brad Stone, The Everything Store: Jeff Bezos and the Age of Amazon

2014

The longlist was announced 6 August 2014. The shortlist was announced 24 September 2014. The winner was announced 11 November 2014.

Julia Angwin, Dragnet Nation: A Quest for Privacy, Security, and Freedom in a World of Relentless Surveillance
Erik Brynjolfsson and Andrew McAfee, The Second Machine Age: Work, Progress, and Prosperity in a Time of Brilliant Technologies
Ed Catmull, Creativity, Inc. Overcoming the Unseen Forces that Stand in the Way of True Inspiration
Nick Davies, Hack Attack: How the Truth Caught Up with Rupert Murdoch
Atif Mian and Amir Sufi, House of Debt: How They (and You) Caused the Great Recession, and How We Can Prevent It from Happening Again
 Thomas Piketty, Capital in the Twenty-First Century

2015

The longlist was announced 12 August. The shortlist was announced 22 September. The winner was announced 17 November. The winner received £30,000, and £10,000 was awarded to each of the remaining shortlisted books.

 Martin Ford, The Rise of the Robots: Technology and the Threat of Mass Unemployment
Jacquie McNish and Sean Silcoff, Losing the Signal: The Untold Story Behind the Extraordinary Rise and Spectacular Fall of Blackberry 
Nathaniel Popper, Digital Gold: The Untold Story of Bitcoin
Anne-Marie Slaughter, Unfinished Business: Women Men Work Family
Richard Thaler, Misbehaving: The Making of Behavioural Economics
Stephen Witt, How Music Got Free: What Happens When an Entire Generation Commits the Same Crime?

2016

The longlist was announced 7 August. The shortlist was announced 9 September. The winner was announced 22 November.

Iris Bohnet, What Works: Gender Equality by Design
Duncan Clark, Alibaba: The House That Jack Ma Built
Rana Foroohar, Makers and Takers: The Rise of Finance and the Fall of American Business
Robert J. Gordon, The Rise and Fall of American Growth: The U.S. Standard of Living Since the Civil War
Lynda Gratton and Andrew Scott, The 100-Year Life: Living and Working in an Age of Longevity
 Sebastian Mallaby, The Man Who Knew: The Life and Times of Alan Greenspan

2017

The longlist was announced 13 August. The shortlist was announced on 19 September. The winner was announced 7 November.

David Enrich, The Spider Network: The Wild Story of a Maths Genius, a Gang of Backstabbing Bankers, and One of the Greatest Scams in Financial History
 Amy Goldstein, Janesville: An American Story
Andrew W. Lo, Adaptive Markets: Financial Evolution at the Speed of Thought
Brian Merchant, The One Device: The Secret History of the iPhone
Ellen Pao, Reset: My Fight for Inclusion and Lasting Change
Walter Scheidel, The Great Leveler: Violence and the History of Inequality from the Stone Age to the Twenty-First Century

2018
The longlist was announced 13 August. The shortlist was announced on 14 September. The winner was announced 12 November.
 John Carreyrou, Bad Blood: Secrets and Lies in a Silicon Valley Startup
James Crabtree, The Billionaire Raj: A Journey Through India's New Gilded Age
Alan Greenspan & Adrian Wooldridge, Capitalism in America: A History
Annie Lowrey, Give People Money: How a Universal Basic Income Would End Poverty, Revolutionize Work, and Remake the World
Mariana Mazzucato, The Value of Everything: Who Makes and Who Takes from the Real Economy
Jeremy Heimans & Henry Timms, New Power: How Power Works in Our Hyperconnected World - and How to Make It Work for You

2019
The longlist was announced 10 August. The shortlist was announced 16 September. The winner was announced 3 December.

 Caroline Criado-Perez, Invisible Women: Exposing Data Bias in a World Designed for Men
David Epstein, Range: Why Generalists Triumph in a Specialized World
 Christopher Leonard, Kochland: The Secret History of Koch Industries and Corporate Power in America
 Raghuram Rajan, The Third Pillar: The Revival of Community in a Polarised World
 Shoshana Zuboff, The Age of Surveillance Capitalism: The Fight for a Human Future at the New Frontier of Power
 Gregory Zuckerman, The Man Who Solved the Market: How Jim Simons Launched the Quant Revolution

2020
The longlist was announced 16 August. The shortlist was announced 23 September. The winner was announced 1 December.

2021
The longlist was announced 15 August. The shortlist was announced on 24 September. The winner was announced on 1 December.

 Javier Blas and Jack Farchy, The World for Sale: Money, Power and the Traders Who Barter the Earth's Resources
 Patrick Radden Keefe, Empire of Pain: The Secret History of the Sackler Dynasty
 Robert Livingston, The Conversation: How Talking Honestly About Racism Can Transform Individuals and Organizations
 Michael E. Mann, The New Climate War: The Fight to Take Back Our Planet
  Nicole Perlroth, This Is How They Tell Me the World Ends: The Cyberweapons Arms Race
 Adrian Wooldridge, The Aristocracy of Talent: How Meritocracy Made the Modern World

2022
The longlist was announced on 14 August.  The shortlist was announced on 22 September. The winner was announced on 5 December.

 Matthew Campbell and Kit Chellel, Dead in the Water: Murder and Fraud in the World’s Most Secretive Industry
 Lulu Chen, Influence Empire: The Story of Tencent and China’s Tech Ambition
 Gary Gerstle, The Rise and Fall of the Neoliberal Order: America and the World in the Free Market Era 
 Sebastian Mallaby, The Power Law: Venture Capital and the Art of Disruption
  Chris Miller, Chip War: The Fight for the World’s Most Critical Technology 
 Helen Thompson, Disorder: Hard Times in the 21st Century

See also 
 McKinsey Award for Best Article of the Year in The Harvard Business Review

Notes

External links
Official website

Awards established in 2005
British literary awards
Business and economics book awards
Financial Times
Goldman Sachs
Literary awards by magazines and newspapers
2005 establishments in the United Kingdom